IL-26, IL 26, or IL26 may refer to:
 Interleukin 26
 Illinois's 26th congressional district, an obsolete district
 Illinois Route 26
 Ilyushin Il-26